William Daniel Eggers (born February 14, 1967) is an American writer, researcher, policy analyst, and government and management consultant. Eggers has worked in government reform for more than two decades.

Personal life
Eggers was born in 1967 in New York City, and grew up in the Chicago suburb of Lake Forest, Illinois. He is the brother of author Dave Eggers. He attended the University of California, San Diego.

Career
He is a former appointee to the U.S. Office of Management and Budget's Performance Measurement Advisory Commission and the former Project Director for the Texas Performance Review/e-Texas initiative. He also served as a Commissioner for the Texas Incentive and Productivity Commission and a designee on the Texas Council on Competitive Government.

He was a former senior fellow at the conservative think tank Manhattan Institute for Policy Research, and the former director of government reform at the libertarian think tank Reason Foundation. 

Eggers is currently the Director of Deloitte's Public Sector Research Group, where he is responsible for research for Deloitte's Public Sector and Federal practices.

Books 
Revolution at the Roots: Making our Government Smaller, Better and Closer to Home (with John O'Leary). The Free Press, 1995. 
Governing by Network: The New Shape of the Public Sector (with Stephen Goldsmith). Brookings Institution Press, 2004. 
Government 2.0: Using Technology to Improve Education, Cut Red Tape, Reduce Gridlock and Enhance Democracy. Rowman and Littlefield, 2005. 
States of Transition: Tackling Government's Toughest Policy and Management Challenges (with Robert Campbell). Deloitte Research, 2006. 
If We Can Put a Man on the Moon: Getting Big Things Done in Government, Harvard Business Press, 2009. 
Public Innovator's Playbook: Nurturing Bold Ideas in Government (with Shalabh Singh). Deloitte Research, 2009. 
Pay for Success (with Paul Macmillan). Ethos Journal, December 2013
The Solution Revolution: How Business, Government, and Social Enterprises Are Teaming Up to Solve Society's Toughest Problems (with Paul Macmillan). Harvard Business Review Press, 2013. 
Delivering on Digital: The Innovators and Technologies That Are Transforming Government. Deloitte University Press and Rosetta Books, 2016.

References

1967 births
Living people
American male writers
Lake Forest High School (Illinois) alumni
People from Lake County, Illinois